General von Rauch may refer to:

Albert von Rauch (1829–1901), Prussian Army general of the infantry
Bonaventura von Rauch (1740–1814), Prussian Army major general
Friedrich von Rauch (born 1855) (1855–1935), Prussian Army general of the cavalry
Gustav von Rauch (1774–1841), Prussian Army general of the infantry
Leopold von Rauch (1787–1860), Prussian Army major general

See also
General Rauch (disambiguation)